The sternothyroid muscle, or sternothyroideus, is an infrahyoid muscle in the neck. It acts to depress the hyoid bone. It is below the sternohyoid muscle. It is shorter and wider than the sternohyoid.

Structure 
The sternothyroid arises from the posterior surface of the manubrium of the sternum, below the origin of the sternohyoid. It also arises from the edge of the cartilage of the first rib. It is inserted into the oblique line on the lamina of the thyroid cartilage. It is in close contact with its fellow at the lower part of the neck, but diverges somewhat as it ascends. It is occasionally traversed by a transverse or oblique tendinous inscription.

Innervation 
The sternothyroid muscle is innervated by the ansa cervicalis.

Variations
Doubling; absence; accessory slips to the thyrohyoid, inferior pharyngeal constrictor, or to the carotid sheath.

Function 
The sternothyroid muscle depresses the hyoid bone, along with the other infrahyoid muscle.

Clinical significance
The upward extension of a thyroid swelling (goitre) is prevented by the attachment of the sternothyroid to the thyroid cartilage. A goitre can therefore only grow to the front, back or middle but no higher.

Additional images

References

External links
 Photo of model at Waynesburg College musclehead/sternothyroid
  - "The Muscular triangle"
 PTCentral

Muscles of the head and neck